Miss Universe 2002 was the 51st Miss Universe pageant, held at the Coliseo Roberto Clemente in San Juan, Puerto Rico on May 29, 2002.  

At the of the event, Denise Quiñones of Puerto Rico crowned Oxana Fedorova of Russia as Miss Universe 2002. This is the first time that Russia has been crowned Miss Universe. 

Contestants from 75 countries competed in this pageant. The competition was hosted by Phil Simms and Daisy Fuentes, while Miss Universe 1997 Brook Lee acted as backstage correspondent. Marc Anthony performed in this year's pageant. This was also the last Miss Universe edition to be aired on CBS.  

Fedorova was dethroned four months later, ostensibly because she could not travel to fulfill her duties, and first runner-up Justine Pasek of Panama took over the Miss Universe title. To date, the 2002 pageant is the only time the 1st runner-up has assumed the title when the reigning Miss Universe became incapable of fulfilling her duties. The official reason for Fedorova's dethronement has not been disclosed by the Miss Universe Organization.

Results

Placements

Final Scores 
{| class="wikitable sortable collapsible" style="font-size:95%"
! width |Country/Territory
! width |Evening Gown
! width |Swimsuit
! width |Average
|- style="background-color:#FADADD;"
|
|9.64 (1)
|9.88 (1)
|9.76 (1)
|- style="background-color:#eadafd;"
|
|8.92 (3)
|8.79 (7)
|8.86 (4)
|- style="background-color:#ccff99;"
|
|9.15 (2)
|8.88 (5)
|9.02 (3)
|- style="background-color:#ffff99;"
||8.79 (6)
|8.90 (4)
|8.85 (5)
|- style="background-color:#d9eefb;"
||8.83 (5)
|9.29 (2)
|9.06 (2)
|-
||8.84 (4)
|8.81 (6)
|8.83 (6)
|-
||8.49 (8)
|9.15 (3)
|8.82 (7)
|-
||8.51 (7)
|8.34 (8)
|8.43 (8)
|-
||8.10 (10)
|8.32 (9)
|8.23 (9)
|-
||8.39 (9)
|7.99 (10)
|8.19 (10)
|}

 Contestants 
75 contestants competed for the title.

Notes

Debut
  Returns

Last competed in 1995:
 Last competed in 1999:
 Last competed in 2000:
   Replacements
  - The winner of Miss España 2001 pageant, Lorena Ayala cut all ties with the Miss España organization and lost the right to representing Spain in any international pageant after a threat of lawsuit against the Miss España Organization by her family side due to breaching her contract with the organization, then they replaced her with the new Miss España 2002, Vania Millán by the Miss Universe Organization's request.

Withdrawals

  - The pageant was canceled due to as one of the effects of the economic crisis that the country faced between 1999 and 2002..
  - The Pageant was postponed to December.
  - Karen Russell - Lack of Sponsorship, went to Miss World 2002.
  - The country was without a franchisee until 2004.
  - Yana Booth-It was not sent due to a local franchisee change.
  - Shirley Yeung - the Miss Hong Kong pageant lost their Miss Universe licence in 2001 due to lack of interest.Since 2003, the territory has sent its candidates to Miss China.
  - Christina Sawaya, Miss Lebanon 2001 withdrew because she supported the Second Intifada and started that she couldn't compete with Miss Israel 2002, Yamit Har-Noy at the pageant. She took part at Miss International 2002 in te latter part of the year and won the crown.
  - Loredana Zammit - The Miss Malta organization lost their Miss Universe licence that year.
  - Attempted to obtain a MU license.  Denied.  Winner of the Miss Mayotte pageant competes in Miss France.
  - 
  - María Gabriela Riquelme Escuna - The Miss Paraguay organization lost their Miss Universe licence. 
  - Bernice Gumbs - Lack of Sponsorship
  - The local pageant was canceled as a protest of the participation of a Chinese candidate from the mainland.
 ' - Euwonka Selver - She was dethroned a few weeks before leaving for the pageant and the organization didn't replace her. Other countries with Miss Universe licence that didn't send delegates that year:
  - The contest was postponed several times until the Summer.
   
  - Lack of Sponsorship.
  - Lost their Miss Universe licence.
  - The pageant was delayed until the middle of 2003.
  - Due to the Zimbabwe economic and political crisis since 2000,the franchisee returned the license to the Miss Universe Organization.

Awards
  - Miss Congeniality (Merlisa George)
  - Miss Photogenic (Isis Casalduc)
 ''' - Best National Costume (Vanessa Mendoza)

References

2002
2002 in Puerto Rico
2002 beauty pageants
Beauty pageants in Puerto Rico
San Juan, Puerto Rico
May 2002 events in North America